The Turkmen records in swimming are the fastest ever performances of swimmers from Turkmenistan, which are recognised and ratified by the National Federation of Aquatics of Turkmenistan.

Long Course (50 m)

Men

Women

Short Course (25 m)

Men

Women

References

Turkmenistan
Records
Swimming
Swimming